Jahura Akter Reshma (born ) is a Bangladeshi female weightlifter, competing in the 48 kg category and representing Bangladesh at international competitions.

She participated at the 2014 Asian Games in the 48 kg event and at the 2014 Summer Youth Olympics in the Girls' 48 kg event.

References

External links

1998 births
Living people
Bangladeshi female weightlifters
Place of birth missing (living people)
Weightlifters at the 2014 Summer Youth Olympics
Weightlifters at the 2014 Asian Games
Asian Games competitors for Bangladesh
20th-century Bangladeshi women
21st-century Bangladeshi women